Naos may refer to:
 A naós or cella, the inner chamber in Greek and Roman temples
 An ancient Greek temple, called a naos in Koine Greek
 Naos (hieroglyph), an Egyptian hieroglyph
 Zeta Puppis, a star

See also 
 Naus (disambiguation)